The Golden Foretaste of Heaven is an album by Alec Empire, released in Japan on November 28, 2007, and in Europe on January 18, 2008. It is his first on his newly established Eat Your Heart Out label. Unlike his previous, rock-oriented efforts post-Atari Teenage Riot (Intelligence and Sacrifice (CD1) and Futurist) this album is completely electronic (with vocals).

Track listing

CD
"New Man" - 3:48
"If You Live or Die" - 3:44
"ICE (As If She Could Steal a Piece of My Glamour)" - 4:00
"1000 Eyes" - 7:18
"Down Satan Down" (Dub) - 3:30
"On Fire" (The Hellish Vortex Sessions) - 4:29
"Robot L.O.V.E." - 3:48
"Death Trap In 3D" - 3:21
"Bug On My Windshield" - 3:47
"No/Why/New York" - 4:19
"ICE" (dub)*
"Naginita"*
* Japanese version only, previously released on the "Robot L.O.V.E." single.

Digital download
Certain bonus tracks can be obtained exclusively through digital downloads. These include:
"EYHO Beats"
"No/Why/New York" (Eat Your Heart Out Minimal Remix)
"Robot L.O.V.E." (Live in Cologne 10/2007)

Release history

Notes

External links
Official Eat Your Heart Out site
Official Alec Empire fansite
Review at Comfort Comes

Alec Empire albums